The Witch's Diner is a South Korean web series starring Song Ji-hyo, Nam Ji-hyun, and Chae Jong-hyeop. It aired on streaming platform TVING from July 16 to August 13, 2021, on every Friday at 16:00 (KST) for 8 episodes.

The series aired on television network tvN from January 5–19, 2022, on every Wednesday and Thursday at 22:30 (KST) for 5 episodes.

Synopsis
The Witch's Diner tells the story of desperate people who come to dine at the restaurant operated by witch Jo Hee-ra (Song Ji-hyo), hoping to get their wishes fulfilled through special meal. In exchange, they have to sacrifice the most precious thing in their life.

Cast

Main
 Song Ji-hyo as Jo Hee-ra
 A witch and the owner of a restaurant that sells food that makes people's wishes come true in return of their soul or other things that she wish from her customer. After meeting Jeong Jin and fulfilling her wishes, she took over the restaurant as exchange for fulfilling Jin's revenge wish.
 Nam Ji-hyun as Jeong Jin
 Employee at Jo Hee-ra's restaurant. Jo Hee-ra came to her life after she hit the rock bottom of her life (being fired from her job, being dumped by her boyfriend, being scammed by a neighbor and her mother left her to take care of her ill father in a sanatorium). She let Jo Hee-ra use her bankrupted restaurant in exchange of a revenge wish against her neighbor.
 Chae Jong-hyeop as Lee Gil-yong
 High school student during daytime and part-time employee at Jo Hee-ra's restaurant during night-time.

Supporting
 Ha Do-kwon as CEO Oh
 Assistant of Jo Hee-ra. He helps to take care of the real world matters such as bills, taxes, etc. He is also in charge of designing the restaurant interior that Hee-ra took over from Jeong Jin.
 Yoon Da-young as Lee Yoon-mi
 Best friend of Jeong Jin and teacher of Lee Gil-yong.
 So Hee-jung as Seo Ae-sook
 Jeong Jin's mother.
 Son Kwang-eob as Lee Man-gap
 Lee Gil-yong's father.
 Shin Joo-hyeop as Young-jae
 Lee Gil-yong's classmate at high school and the person who influenced Gil-yong's life.
 Han So-eun as Kang Su-jeong
 A friend of the same class as Gil-yong who tries to live up to her parents' expectations. Her father is a high-ranking official and her mother is a university professor.
 Baek Sung-chul as Ko Hyun-woo
 A bully at Lee Gil-yong's class who torments both Gil-yong and Young-jae.
 Ji Soo-won as Park Seon
 Great witch. The descendants of witches from generation to generation.

Special appearances
 Lee Kyu-hyung as Jo Hee-ra's last guest (Ep. 1)
 Ahn Eun-jin as Jin Sun-mi
 Kang Ki-doong as Bae Yoon-ki
 A desperate job-seeker whom came to the restaurant, he is willing to do anything to find a job.
 Yoon Ji-on as Ahn Seong-ho
 Jin Sun-mi's boyfriend.
 Lee Joo-sil as Lee Bok-nan
 Landlord of Lee Gil-yong house.
 Im Won-hee as Goo Hyo-sik
 Son of Lee Bok-nan.
 Han Ji-eun as Book Writer
 Writer of The Witch's Diner. A desperate writer that need a new ideas for her new book in order to meet the deadline provided by the publisher.

Original soundtrack

Part 1

Part 2

Part 3

Part 4

Part 5

Viewership

References

External links
  
 
 

Korean-language television shows
South Korean web series
2021 web series debuts
Television shows based on South Korean novels
South Korean drama web series
2021 South Korean television series debuts
TVING original programming
Television series by Studio Dragon